Richard Alexander Gibbs, is an Australian geneticist. He is currently the Wofford Cain Chair and Professor of Molecular and Human Genetics at Baylor College of Medicine in Houston, Texas.

In 1996, he founded the Human Genome Sequencing Center at BCM, which was one of five worldwide sites selected to complete the final phase of the Human Genome Project.

References

External links
Richard A. Gibbs, Ph.D. (Department of Molecular and Human Genetics, Baylor College of Medicine)

1950s births
Living people
Australian geneticists
Companions of the Order of Australia
University of Melbourne alumni
Australian expatriates in the United States
Human Genome Project scientists